Cañasgordas is a town and municipality in Antioquia Department, Colombia.

Climate
Cañasgordas has a tropical rainforest climate (Af) with heavy rainfall year-round.

References

Municipalities of Antioquia Department